Clan Hay (Scottish Gaelic: Garadh or MacGaradh) is a Scottish clan of the Grampian region of Scotland that has played an important part in the history and politics of the country. Members of the clan are to be found in most parts of Scotland and in many other parts of the world. However, the North East of Scotland, i.e. Aberdeenshire (historic), Banffshire, Morayshire and Nairnshire Nairn (boundaries), is the heart of Hay country with other significant concentrations of Hays being found in Perthshire, especially around Perth, in the Scottish Borders, and in Shetland.

Origin of the name

The family name is derived from that of several villages called La Haye in the Cotentin Peninsula of Normandy, France. The word, haye comes from haia, a hedge, which in modern French is haie. It can also mean "stockade", but it may have been used here because this part of Normandy is characterized by centuries-old interlocking hedgerows (bocage). The French, de la Haye, The name has evolved into English as Hay and rendered into Gaelic as Garadh. According to George Fraser Black, the Gaelic form of Hay, MacGaradh, was merely an invention of John Hay Allan, also known as John Sobieski Stuart, author of the dubious Vestiarium Scoticum.

Legend of Luncarty
There are two ways to approach the origins of Clan Hay. The first is the Legend of Luncarty, which is an important Hay tradition, while the second is based on historical research, albeit that inconsistencies tend to occur after so many centuries.
Hector Boece, the Scottish academic, wrote the first known account of the Luncarty legend in his Scotorium Historia, which was initially published in 1525, with a second edition being published posthumously in 1575. There are numerous versions of the legend that are based upon Boece's work but which include various embellishments. In contrast, George Buchanan's account in his Rerum Scoticarum Historia, published in 1582 and derived from Boece's work, omits any reference to the hawk's flight delineating the land grant. In 2010, Sutton published a hypertext edition, in both Latin and English, of Boece's 1575 edition of the Historia, thus providing ready access to his original account of the legend. The version of the legend quoted below is from John Burke's "Peerage", 1832 edition.

"The traditional origin of the noble house of Hay is thus related:—In the reign of Kenneth III, anno 980, the Danes, who had invaded Scotland, having prevailed, at the battle of Luncarty, near Perth, were pursuing the flying Scots, from the field, when a countryman and his two sons appeared in a narrow pass, through which the vanquished were hurrying, and impeded for a moment their flight. "What," said the rustic, "had you rather be slaughtered by your merciless foes, than die honorably in the field; come, rally, rally!" and he headed the fugitives, brandishing his ploughshare, and crying out, that help was at hand: the Danes, believing that a fresh army was falling upon them, fled in confusion, and the Scots thus recovered the laurel which they had lost, and freed their country from servitude. The battle being won, the old man, afterwards known by the name of Hay, was brought to the king, who, assembling a parliament at Scone, gave to the said Hay and his sons, as a just reward for their valour, so much land on the river Tay, in the district of Gowrie, as a falcon from a man's hand flew over till it settled; which being six miles in length, was afterwards called Errol; and the king being desirous to elevate Hay and his sons from their humble rank in life, to the order of nobility, his majesty assigned them a coat of arms, which was argent, three escutcheons, gules, to intimate that the father and two sons had been the three fortunate shields of Scotland."

The reliability of the legend has often been challenged. For instance, the Scottish historian John Hill Burton strongly suspected the battle of Luncarty to be an invention of Hector Boece, Burton was incorrect. Walter Bower, writing in his Scotichronicon around 1440, some 87 years before Boece first published his Scotorum Historia, refers to the battle briefly as follows: '"that remarkable battle of Luncarty, in which the Norsemen with their king were totally destroyed". Bower does not quote specific sources concerning the battle, but, two sentences later, he refers generally to ancient writings that he has consulted.  The term Norsemen would include Danes.

The evidence that the battle actually occurred, other than Bower's brief reference to it about 1440 AD, was described by Reverend Moncrieff around 1791 in the First Statistical Accounts of Scotland. He witnessed the opening of the last remaining tumuli (burial mounds) on the reputed battlefield and describes the finding of human remains, including ashes and bones, together with weapons and bridles. These were not examined by professional archaeologists to determine whether they were consistent with the presumed date of the battle, as they would have been had the retrieval occurred in modern times. Moreover, the artifacts would not have been allowed to have been taken by local inhabitants, one of whom made farming implements of some of them. Similarly, the retrieval predated the use of radiocarbon dating techniques which would have dated the remains with considerable accuracy. Moncrieff also emphasizes the strong tradition of the battle among the local inhabitants; one individual, whose family had lived in the area for generations, could describe the battle as if it occurred yesterday. Two local names provide further evidence of the battle. First, the reputed battle site is located in Redgorton Parish. The name means red fields, perhaps fields of blood, and stretches back for centuries. Second, Turnagain Hillock is where the Danes are said to have been repulsed.

It is noteworthy that there is a discrepancy concerning the reputed date of the battle, 980 AD, and the identity of the king who led the Scots in the battle. He is invariably identified as Kenneth III of Scotland, but he reigned from 997 to 1005 AD; Kenneth II of Scotland reigned from 971 to 995 AD.

Regarding the legend, Sir James Balfour Paul, noting that armorial bearings did not occur in Scotland till long after 980 (when the battle is said to have taken place), referred to Hector Boece as "an incorrigible old liar" in this and other stories. Cosmo Innes, further noting that surnames did not occur in Scotland till long after 980, states that the name Hay has as origin a place name in Normandy. This last point is discussed in the section, Origin of the Name, of this article.

History

William II de Haya

Clan Hay descends from the Norman family of de la Haye (de Haya). The progenitors of the Scottish clan were William II de Haya and his wife, Eva of Pitmilly William II de Haya was the son of William I de Haya and his Norman wife, Juliana de Soulis, sister to Ranulf I de Soules. He was the first recorded Hay in Scotland, is known to have been in the Scottish court in 1160, was cup-bearer to Malcolm IV of Scotland and William I of Scotland, and was made the first Baron of Erroll by William I. He died soon after 1201 and was succeeded by his eldest son, David.

Connection to the de La Haye of Normandy

The origins of the Hays of Erroll were investigated around 1954 by Wagner who presented evidence, based largely on heraldry, that the Scottish Hays were descended from de La Haye of La Haye-Hue in the Cotentin Peninsula of Normandy. That evidence begins with a seal used by David de Haya (Haia), the son of William II de Haya, on a charter around 1230. It shows the arms of argent three inescutcheons gules, i.e., a silver shield containing three smaller red shields, and are the same arms presently used by the Earl of Erroll. They bear no resemblance to those of the de La Haye of England, but they are the same as those used by Jean de La Haye-Hue in Normandy around 1368–1375.

The de La Haye of La Haye Hue can be traced back to the 12th century, that is, when William II de Haya was first known to be in Scotland. Wagner therefore concluded that the Hays of Erroll and the Hayes of La Haye were related. He also pointed out that the Hays were linked to the powerful Normandy family of Soulis Ranulf I de Soules in that La Haye-Hue, now called La Haye-Bellefond, is located just across the small Soules River from Soulles, the seat of that family. Secondly, the Soulis name, rare in England, and the more common Hay, are both found in the records of Dover castle in the early 13th century.

A third point, which Wagner did not mention, is that William I de Haya married Juliana de Soulis and these two were the parents of William II de Haya.

Successors of William II de Haya

David de Haya, who wedded Helen, daughter of Gilbert (or Gille Brigte), Earl of Strathearn, and had:
 Gilbert, who succeeded his father at Erroll, was ancestor of the Noble house of the Earls Errol, which ended in heiresses in 1717: the youngest of whom espoused the Earl of Kilmarnock, and her descendant is now Earl of Erroll.
 William de Haya, obtained from his brother Gilbert, in 1235, a grant of two carucates of land, in Errol, called Leys; which grant was afterwards confirmed, in 1451, by William, Earl of Errol, to Edmund Hay, of Leys, the lineal descendant of this William. This branch would later change their name to Hay-Balfour of Leys in the county of Perth, and of Randerston, in Fife. According to John Burke, the Hay-Balfours of Leys are the "male representative of the noble family of Hay".
 David, parson of Erroll.

Gilbert, who succeeded his father at Erroll, was Sheriff of Perth before 1262. He was appointed one of the regents and guardians to King Alexander III. He married Idonea, daughter of William Comyn, Earl of Buchan, and had a son, Nicolas.

Wars of Scottish Independence
His son, Nicolas de Haya of Erroll was Sheriff of Perth before 1288. He swore fealty to King Edward I on 12 July 1296. He was summoned by Edward I to attend parliament at St. Andrews in 1303–04. He had four sons:

 1 Gilbert de Haye of Erroll
 2 Nicolas, parson of Fossoway, then Dean of Dunkeld
 3 John, parson of Erroll
 4 Hugh de la Haye of Locharwart, one of the companions of Robert the Bruce, swore fealty to Edward I at Aberdeen in 1296 and was captured during Battle of Methven

The son, Gilbert swore fealty to Edward I at Aberdeen in 1296. However, in 1306 he joined Robert the Bruce and continued faithfully to him throughout the War of Independence. Gilbert supported the Bruce at the victory of the Battle of Bannockburn in 1314. In consequence Edward I declared Gilbert a traitor, but Robert the Bruce rewarded him with a charter over the lands of Slains in Aberdeenshire and the office of Constable of the realm of Scotland. Gilbert de la Hay was also a signatory to the Declaration of Arbroath, 1320 .

16th century and Anglo Scottish Wars
During the Anglo-Scottish Wars the Clan Hay suffered very heavy casualties in the Battle of Flodden in 1513. Another Hay, also named Sir Gilbert, was a Scottish knight who fought for Joan of Arc during the Hundred Years' War.

Following the Reformation, the Hays remained loyal to Catholicism and thus were allies to Mary, Queen of Scots, who appointed George Hay, the 7th Earl of Erroll, Lord Lieutenant of all central Scotland. Francis Hay, 9th Earl of Erroll, was involved in a conspiracy with King Philip II of Spain, to overthrow Queen Elizabeth of England, convert King James VI to Catholicism and thus make Britain a Catholic stronghold. With the defeat of the Spanish Armada, however, the conspiracy came to nothing. In 1594 the Earl of Errol went into exile and Slains Castle was blown up under the supervision of the king, and has remained a ruin ever since.

17th century and Civil War
During the Civil War James Hay led his forces as Royalists against the Covenanters at the Battle of Aberdeen in 1644, where they were victorious. Sir William Hay of Delgaite served with James Graham, 1st Marquis of Montrose as his chief of staff during his campaign in support of Charles I of England. However Hay was captured, imprisoned and then executed in 1650, although he was given a state funeral after the Restoration of 1660.

18th century and Jacobite risings
Following the Act of Union in 1707, the Hays were sympathetic to the Jacobite cause. The Clan Hay remained loyal to the Stuarts in both the Jacobite rising of 1715 and the Jacobite rising of 1745. The 13th Earl of Errol received the Order of the Thistle from James Francis Edward Stuart (the Old Pretender). He was succeeded by his sister, Mary, who used the ruins of their fortress of Old Slains Castle as meeting point for Jacobite agents and it was she who personally called out the Clan Hay to fight for Charles Edward Stuart.

With the collapse of Jacobitism, the Hays became loyal British subjects, and many Hays were involved in expanding the British Empire.

Clan profile

 Gaelic Names: MacGaraidh (Surname) & Clann 'icGaraidh (Collective)
 Motto: Serva Jugum (Keep the yoke)
 Slogan: "A Hay! A Hay! A Hay!"
 Clan Hay Society: The Official website of The Clan Hay
 Pipe Music: "A Hay - From A Hay To Delgatie Castle" and "Stand Up Scotland"
 Pipe Band: Clan Hay Pipe Band Pipe Major: Philippe Vervoort
 Pipe Band Facebook Page: FB Clan Hay Pipe Band
 Crest: Issuing out of a Crest Coronet, a falcon volant Proper, armed, jessed, and belled Or
 Clan badge: Mistletoe
 Animal Symbol: Falcon
 Chief's Arms: Argent, three escutcheons Gules

Chief

 Merlin Sereld Victor Gilbert Hay, the 24th Earl of Erroll, the Lord Hay, the Lord Slains, Baronet and Chief of the Name and Arms of Hay

Castles

 Delgatie Castle, Aberdeen, Scotland was given to the Clan Hay after the Battle of Bannockburn in 1314.
 Slains Castle was owned by the chiefs of Clan Hay from 1597 to 1916.
 Old Slains Castle, Aberdeenshire, Scotland.
 New Slains Castle, Aberdeenshire, Scotland.
 Dupplin Castle, Perth, Scotland
 Duns Castle, Berwickshire, Scotland
 Inshoch Castle, Nairnshire, Scotland
 Megginch Castle, Perth, Scotland
 Neidpath Castle, Peebles, Scotland
 Park Castle, Galloway, Scotland
 Yester Castle, East Lothian, Scotland

Roll of arms

Tartans
Low country pairtes (Lowland Clans)

See also
 Scottish clan
 The lands of Errol
 Hay baronets

References

Further sources

External links

 Clan Hay Society – Official Website (beginning 2010)
 Clan Hay Society – American Branch (Official Website)
 Clan Hay Society (formerly Official Clan Hay Website through 2010)
 The Clan Hay Pipe Band
 Clan Hay Pipe Band Facebook Page
 The Hay DNA Project
 Clan Hay page in The Standing Council of Scottish Chiefs Website
 The Hay Family in Scotland
 Hay family crest
 Hay's roll of arms
 Hay Tartans
 Clan Hay ScotClans

(This information is incomplete, with the hay clan's utter most descendants having relations to the Wyllie-Gunn's, withholding facts.

 
Scottish clans
Scoto-Norman clans